Georgios Vrakas (born 28 April 2001) is a Greek professional footballer who plays as an attacking midfielder for Super League club Levadiakos, on loan from PAOK.

Career

Early career
Giorgos Vrakas was born on April 28, 2001 in Ioannina and from an early age joined the Academies of AO Ioannina. In 2014, he took the big step and became a member of the PAOK Academy. With the black and white, he impressed in all age groups – he was of course a constant preference in the calls of the federal technicians – and in 2017 he made his debut with the first team in a game against Aiginiakos for the Greek Cup. In fact, he became the second youngest player to debut with PAOK.

Napoli
In August 2018, he left and joined Napoli's second team for a five-year deal. In two years in Italy, Vrakas participated in 20 matches, scoring three goals and providing three assists. In the summer of 2020, he decided to return to Greece, with PAOK not missing the opportunity and signing the young attacking midfielder for the next three years".

PAOK
An old ... acquaintance, trained with the philosophy of the PAOK Academy, Giorgos Vrakas returned to PAOK, signing a cooperation contract with Dikefalos until 2023. Giorgos Vrakas will continue his career at Levadiakos. The 20-year-old midfielder returned to PAOK from Napoli last year, making just three appearances (two in the league and one in the Cup) for the Northern Doubleheader last season. Vrakas agreed with Levadeiakos, who announced his acquisition. "Despite the fact that there were proposals from Dutch teams, it was preferred for the footballer to continue with the team that gave him an important role in the attempt to rise to the Super League", it is emphasized by PAOK regarding Vrakas, who the previous year was one of its pioneers promotion on behalf of Levadeaikos, counting 34 appearances and 5 goals.

Honours
PAOK
Greek Cup: 2017–18, 2020–21
Levadiakos
Super League 2: 2021–22

References

External links

2001 births
Living people
Greek footballers
Greece youth international footballers
Super League Greece players
Levadiakos F.C. players
S.S.C. Napoli players
PAOK FC players
Association football forwards
Greek expatriate sportspeople in Italy
Greek expatriate footballers
Footballers from Ioannina